Square Peak is located in the Livingston Range, Glacier National Park in the U.S. state of Montana. Square Peak is  SSW of Rainbow Peak.

See also
 List of mountains and mountain ranges of Glacier National Park (U.S.)

References

Livingston Range
Mountains of Flathead County, Montana
Mountains of Glacier National Park (U.S.)
Mountains of Montana